Siddalingaiah (1954 in Magadi, Bangalore – 11 June 2021), was an Indian poet, playwright, and Dalit activist, writing in the Kannada language. He is credited with starting the Dalit-Bandaya movement in Kannada and with starting the genre of Dalit writing. He is one of the founders of the Dalita Sangharsh Samiti along with B. Krishnappa.

In 1988, at the age of 34, he became a member of the Karnataka Legislative Council, serving till 2001 and, in 2006, chairman of the Kannada Development Authority, a post with Cabinet rank that he held until 2008.

He has been head of the Department of Kannada at Bangalore University and a member of the University Syndicate of Kannada University, Hampi. He is acknowledged as a symbol of the Dalit movement and a leading public intellectual and Kannada poet.

Death
Siddalingaiah died on 11 June 2021, in Bangalore, due to a COVID-19 illness.

Works

Poetry
 Holemadigara Haadu (Songs of the Holeya and Madiga, 1975)

 Saaviraaru Nadigalu (Thousands of Rivers, 1979)

 Kappu Kaadina Haadu (The Song of the Black Forest, 1982)

 Aayda Kavithegalu (Selected Poems, 1997)

 Meravanige (Procession, 2000)

 Nanna Janagalu mattu Itara Kavitegalu (My People and Other Poems, 2005)

 Kudiva Neeliya Kadalu (2017)

 Ooru Saagaravagi (2018)

Autobiography

 Ooru Keri-1 : Atmakathana (1997)

 Ooru Keri-2 : Atmakathana (2006)

 Ooru Keri-3 : Atmakathana (2014)

 Ooru Keri - An Autobiography (Sahitya Akademi, 2003)

 A Word With You, World : The Autobiography of a Poet (Navayana, 2013) Translated by S.R. Ramakrishna (Excerpt)

 Satyanarayana, K & Tharu, Susie (2013) From those Stubs Steel Nibs are Sprouting: New Dalit Writing from South Asia, Dossier 2: Kannada and Telugu, New Delhi: HarperCollins India.

Plays

 Panchama

 Nelasama

 Ekalavya

Criticism and Essays
 Hakkkinota
 Gramadevathegalu
 Avataragalu
 Jana Samsakruthi 
 Aa Mukha Ee Mukha

Accolades 
 2019 - Pampa Award, highest literary award in Kannada, presented by Karnataka Government
 2018 - Nrupatunga Award by BBMP
 2015 - Chaired the 81st Kannada Sahitya Sammelana held in Shravanabelagola
 2007 - Nadoja Award by Hampi University
 1998-99 -Karnataka State Film Award for Best Lyricist for his song Hasivininda Satthoru from the movie 'Pratibhatane'
 1986 - Rajyotsava Award by Karnataka Government
 2022 - Padma Shri Award (Posthumous) for Literature and Education by Government of India

See also
 K. B. Siddaiah
 Aravinda Malagatti
 Devanur Mahadeva

References 

1954 births
2021 deaths
Dalit writers
Kannada-language writers
Dalit leaders
Kannada poets
Bandaya writers
Indian male dramatists and playwrights
Writers from Bangalore
Poets from Karnataka
20th-century Indian writers
Indian male poets
Activists from Karnataka
Karnataka MLAs 1989–1994
Politicians from Bangalore
20th-century Indian male writers
Deaths from the COVID-19 pandemic in India